Sālote Lupepauʻu ( – 8 September 1889) was the Queen consort of Tonga from 1845 to 1889. She was the wife of George Tupou I and namesake of the Queen Salote College.

Life
Born around 1811, Lupepauʻu was the daughter of Tamatauʻhala, Makamālohi and Halaʻevalu Moheʻofo. Her father was the son of the daughter of the Tuʻi Tonga Fefine and her mother was the daughter of Fīnau ʻUlukālala II ʻi Feletoa. Lupepauʻu was considered to be of high sino'i 'eiki rank in the traditional order. From an early age, she was married to Laufilitonga, the last holder of the title Tuʻi Tonga. Tāufaʻāhau (the future George Tupou I) eloped with Lupepauʻu sometime after Laufilitonga's defeat at Battle of Velata against the forces of Tāufaʻāhau. After his adoption of Christianity, Tāufaʻāhau repudiated all his secondary consorts and their children and made Lupepauʻu his principal wife. After their conversion, Tāufaʻāhau took the name George Tupou I in honor of King George III of the United Kingdom while Lupepauʻu was named Sālote or Charlotte after Queen Charlotte of the United Kingdom.

With George Tupou I, she had two sons: Tuʻuakitau (1839–1842) and Vuna Takitakimālohi (1844–1862). Their children were the only heirs of Tupou I considered legitimate and eligible to succeed to the Tonga throne under Christian law and the childless death of Vuna in 1862 left the question of succession in question The succession would remain vacant for thirteen years until the promulgation of Tonga's first constitution in 1875, which legitimized Tupou's illegitimate son Tēvita ʻUnga and named him Crown Prince.

In 1854, she sat for a watercolor portrait painted by British geologist James Gay Sawkins.

Lupepauʻu died on 8 September 1889. In 1914, the Kolisi Fefine was renamed Queen Salote College in her honor. The name Sālote would become a recurring tradition in the Tongan royal family. Her husband's great-great granddaughter Sālote Tupou III, however, was named after her great-grandmother Sālote Mafile‘o Pilolevu.

References

Bibliography

 
 
 
 

Tongan royalty
1811 births
1889 deaths
Tongan Methodists
Tongan royal consorts
19th-century Tongan women
19th-century Tongan people